The Kichik Bazar Mosque is a mosque in the city of Lankaran, Azerbaijan. By the order of the Cabinet of Ministers of the Republic of Azerbaijan dated 2 August 2001, the mosque was taken under the state protection as an architectural monument of history and culture of local importance (No. 4806).

Description 
The mosque was built in 1906. The construction mainly used red baked bricks, local types of wood and ceramic tiles.

The mosque got its name thanks to its location - the place Kichik Bazar (Small Bazaar) in the center of Lankaran. The left door of the mosque was made by the master Mammadhasan Najar, a member of the Fujul-Fusah literary collection, and the right door was made by the master Mammadali. When the mosque was built, there was a magnificent minaret next to it, known as Guldesta. This magnificent minaret was demolished after the Soviet occupation in the 1930s under the slogan “Fighting Religion”.

The building of the mosque is 26 meters long and 10 meters wide, the thickness of the walls is 1 meter. The 24-meter minaret, built after the destruction of the original minaret by the Soviet regime, has a repeating Arabic inscription "Allah" lined with white brick. Inside the mosque can simultaneously pray 250 people.

Photos

See also 
 Boyuk Bazar Mosque

References

Mosques in Lankaran